The 53rd United States Congress was a meeting of the legislative branch of the United States federal government, consisting of the United States Senate and the United States House of Representatives. It met in Washington, D.C. from March 4, 1893, to March 4, 1895, during the first two years of Grover Cleveland's second presidency. The apportionment of seats in the House of Representatives was based on the 1890 United States census.

The Democrats maintained their majority in the House (albeit reduced) and won back control of the Senate. With Grover Cleveland being sworn in on March 4, 1893 for his second stint as President, this also gave the Democrats an overall federal government trifecta for the first time since the establishment of the Republican Party in 1854.

Party summary
The count below identifies party affiliations at the beginning of the first session of this Congress, and includes members from vacancies and newly admitted states, when they were first seated. Changes resulting from subsequent replacements are shown below in the "Changes in membership" section.

Senate

House of Representatives

Leadership

Senate 
 President: Adlai Stevenson (D)
 President pro tempore: Charles F. Manderson (D)
 Isham G. Harris (D), elected March 22, 1893
 Matt Whitaker Ransom (D), elected January 7, 1895
 Isham G. Harris (D), elected January 10, 1895
 Democratic Caucus Chairman: Arthur P. Gorman
 Republican Conference Chairman: John Sherman

House of Representatives

 Speaker: Charles F. Crisp (D)
 Minority Leader: Thomas B. Reed (R)
 Democratic Caucus Chairman: William S. Holman
 Democratic Campaign Committee Chairman: Charles James Faulkner
 Republican Conference Chairman: Thomas J. Henderson
 Republican Campaign Committee Chairman: Joseph W. Babcock

Major events

 March 4, 1893: Grover Cleveland became President of the United States for a second time.
 May 5, 1893: Panic of 1893: A crash on the New York Stock Exchange started a depression.
 November 7, 1893: Colorado women were granted the right to vote
 May 1, 1894: Coxey's Army, the first significant American protest march, arrived in Washington, D.C.

Major legislation

 July 16, 1894: Utah Enabling Act
 August 27, 1894: Wilson–Gorman Tariff Act
 February 18, 1895: Maguire Act of 1895

Members
This list is arranged by chamber, then by state. Senators are listed by class and Members of the House are listed by district.

Skip to House of Representatives, below

Senate
Senators were elected by the state legislatures every two years, with one-third beginning new six-year terms with each Congress. Preceding the names in the list below are Senate class numbers, which indicate the cycle of their election. In this Congress, Class 1 meant their term began in this Congress, facing re-election in 1898; Class 2 meant their term ended in this Congress, facing re-election in 1894; and Class 3 meant their term began in the last Congress, facing re-election in 1896.

Alabama 
 2. John T. Morgan (D)
 3. James L. Pugh (D)

Arkansas 
 2. James H. Berry (D)
 3. James K. Jones (D)

California 
 1. Stephen M. White (D)
 3. Leland Stanford (R), until June 21, 1893
 George C. Perkins (R), from July 26, 1893

Colorado 
 2. Edward O. Wolcott (R)
 3. Henry M. Teller (R)

Connecticut 
 1. Joseph R. Hawley (R)
 3. Orville H. Platt (R)

Delaware 
 1. George Gray (D)
 2. Anthony Higgins (R)

Florida 
 1. Samuel Pasco (D)
 3. Wilkinson Call (D)

Georgia 
 2. Alfred H. Colquitt (D), until March 26, 1894
 Patrick Walsh (D), from April 2, 1894
 3. John B. Gordon (D)

Idaho 
 2. George L. Shoup (R)
 3. Fred T. Dubois (R)

Illinois 
 2. Shelby M. Cullom (R)
 3. John McAuley Palmer (D)

Indiana 
 1. David Turpie (D)
 3. Daniel W. Voorhees (D)

Iowa 
 2. James F. Wilson (R)
 3. William B. Allison (R)

Kansas 
 2. John Martin (D)
 3. William A. Peffer (P)

Kentucky 
 2. William Lindsay (D)
 3. Joseph C. S. Blackburn (D)

Louisiana 
 2. Donelson Caffery (D)
 3. Edward D. White (D), until March 12, 1894
 Newton C. Blanchard (D), from March 12, 1894

Maine 
 1. Eugene Hale (R)
 2. William P. Frye (R)

Maryland 
 1. Arthur Pue Gorman (D)
 3. Charles H. Gibson (D)

Massachusetts 
 1. Henry Cabot Lodge (R)
 2. George F. Hoar (R)

Michigan 
 1. Francis B. Stockbridge (R), until April 30, 1894
 John Patton Jr. (R), from May 5, 1894, until January 14, 1895
 Julius C. Burrows (R), from January 24, 1895
 2. James McMillan (R)

Minnesota 
 1. Cushman K. Davis (R)
 2. William D. Washburn (R)

Mississippi 
 1. James Z. George (D)
 2. Edward C. Walthall (D), until January 24, 1894
 Anselm J. McLaurin (D), from February 7, 1894

Missouri 
 1. Francis M. Cockrell (D)
 3. George G. Vest (D)

Montana 
 1. Lee Mantle (R), from January 16, 1895
 2. Thomas C. Power (R)

Nebraska 
 1. William V. Allen (P)
 2. Charles F. Manderson (R)

Nevada 
 1. William M. Stewart (S)
 3. John P. Jones (R)

New Hampshire 
 2. William E. Chandler (R)
 3. Jacob H. Gallinger (R)

New Jersey 
 1. James Smith Jr. (D)
 2. John R. McPherson (D)

New York 
 1. Edward Murphy Jr. (D)
 3. David B. Hill (D)

North Carolina 
 2. Matt W. Ransom (D)
 3. Zebulon B. Vance (D), until April 14, 1894
 Thomas J. Jarvis (D), from April 19, 1894, until January 23, 1895
 Jeter C. Pritchard (R), from January 23, 1895

North Dakota 
 1. William N. Roach (D)
 3. Henry C. Hansbrough (R)

Ohio 
 1. John Sherman (R)
 3. Calvin S. Brice (D)

Oregon 
 2. Joseph N. Dolph (R)
 3. John H. Mitchell (R)

Pennsylvania 
 1. Matthew S. Quay (R)
 3. J. Donald Cameron (R)

Rhode Island 
 1. Nelson W. Aldrich (R)
 2. Nathan F. Dixon III (R)

South Carolina 
 2. Matthew C. Butler (D)
 3. John L. M. Irby (D)

South Dakota 
 2. Richard F. Pettigrew (R)
 3. James H. Kyle (P)

Tennessee 
 1. William B. Bate (D)
 2. Isham G. Harris (D)

Texas 
 1. Roger Q. Mills (D)
 2. Richard Coke (D)

Vermont 
 1. Redfield Proctor (R)
 3. Justin S. Morrill (R)

Virginia 
 1. John W. Daniel (D)
 2. Eppa Hunton, II (D)

Washington 
 1. John L. Wilson (R), from February 19, 1895
 3. Watson C. Squire (R)

West Virginia 
 1. Charles J. Faulkner (D)
 2. Johnson N. Camden (D)

Wisconsin 
 1. John L. Mitchell (D)
 3. William F. Vilas (D)

Wyoming 
 1. Clarence D. Clark (R), from January 23, 1895
 2. Joseph M. Carey (R)

House of Representatives

Alabama 

 . Richard H. Clarke (D)
 . Jesse F. Stallings (D)
 . William C. Oates (D), until November 5, 1894
 George P. Harrison (D), from November 6, 1894
 . Gaston A. Robbins (D)
 . James E. Cobb (D)
 . John H. Bankhead (D)
 . William H. Denson (D)
 . Joseph Wheeler (D)
 . Louis W. Turpin (D)

Arkansas 

 . Philip D. McCulloch Jr. (D)
 . Clifton R. Breckinridge (D), until August 14, 1894
 John S. Little (D), from December 3, 1894
 . Thomas C. McRae (D)
 . William L. Terry (D)
 . Hugh A. Dinsmore (D)
 . Robert Neill (D)

California 

 . Thomas J. Geary (D)
 . Anthony Caminetti (D)
 . Samuel G. Hilborn (R), until April 4, 1894
 Warren B. English (D), from April 4, 1894
 . James G. Maguire (D)
 . Eugene F. Loud (R)
 . Marion Cannon (P)
 . William W. Bowers (R)

Colorado 

 . Lafe Pence (P)
 . John C. Bell (P)

Connecticut 

 . Lewis Sperry (D)
 . James P. Pigott (D)
 . Charles A. Russell (R)
 . Robert E. De Forest (D)

Delaware 

 . John W. Causey (D)

Florida 

 . Stephen R. Mallory (D)
 . Charles M. Cooper (D)

Georgia 

 . Rufus E. Lester (D)
 . Benjamin E. Russell (D)
 . Charles F. Crisp (D)
 . Charles L. Moses (D)
 . Leonidas F. Livingston (D)
 . Thomas B. Cabaniss (D)
 . John W. Maddox (D)
 . Thomas G. Lawson (D)
 . Farish C. Tate (D)
 . James C. C. Black (D)
 . Henry G. Turner (D)

Idaho 

 . Willis Sweet (R)

Illinois 

 . J. Frank Aldrich (R)
 . Lawrence E. McGann (D)
 . Allan C. Durborow Jr. (D)
 . Julius Goldzier (D)
 . Albert J. Hopkins (R)
 . Robert R. Hitt (R)
 . Thomas J. Henderson (R)
 . Robert A. Childs (R)
 . Hamilton K. Wheeler (R)
 . Philip S. Post (R), until January 6, 1895
 . Benjamin F. Marsh (R)
 . John J. McDannold (D)
 . William M. Springer (D)
 . Benjamin F. Funk (R)
 . Joseph G. Cannon (R)
 . George W. Fithian (D)
 . Edward Lane (D)
 . William S. Forman (D)
 . James R. Williams (D)
 . George Washington Smith (R)
 . John C. Black (D), until January 12, 1895
 . Andrew J. Hunter (D)

Indiana 

 . Arthur H. Taylor (D)
 . John L. Bretz (D)
 . Jason B. Brown (D)
 . William S. Holman (D)
 . George W. Cooper (D)
 . Henry U. Johnson (R)
 . William D. Bynum (D)
 . Elijah V. Brookshire (D)
 . Daniel W. Waugh (R)
 . Thomas Hammond (D)
 . Augustus N. Martin (D)
 . William F. McNagny (D)
 . Charles G. Conn (D)

Iowa 

 . John H. Gear (R)
 . Walter I. Hayes (D)
 . David B. Henderson (R)
 . Thomas Updegraff (R)
 . Robert G. Cousins (R)
 . John F. Lacey (R)
 . John A. T. Hull (R)
 . William P. Hepburn (R)
 . Alva L. Hager (R)
 . Jonathan P. Dolliver (R)
 . George D. Perkins (R)

Kansas 

 . Case Broderick (R)
 . Edward H. Funston (R), until August 2, 1894
 Horace L. Moore (D), from August 2, 1894
 . Thomas J. Hudson (P)
 . Charles Curtis (R)
 . John Davis (P)
 . William Baker (P)
 . Jeremiah Simpson (P)
 . William A. Harris (P)

Kentucky 

 . William J. Stone (D)
 . William T. Ellis (D)
 . Isaac H. Goodnight (D)
 . Alexander B. Montgomery (D)
 . Asher G. Caruth (D)
 . Albert S. Berry (D)
 . William C. P. Breckinridge (D)
 . James B. McCreary (D)
 . Thomas H. Paynter (D), until January 5, 1895
 . Marcus C. Lisle (D), until July 7, 1894
 William M. Beckner (D), from December 3, 1894
 . Silas Adams (R)

Louisiana 

 . Adolph Meyer (D)
 . Robert C. Davey (D)
 . Andrew Price (D)
 . Newton C. Blanchard (D), until March 12, 1894
 Henry W. Ogden (D), from May 12, 1894
 . Charles J. Boatner (D)
 . Samuel M. Robertson (D)

Maine 

 . Thomas B. Reed (R)
 . Nelson Dingley Jr. (R)
 . Seth L. Milliken (R)
 . Charles A. Boutelle (R)

Maryland 

 . Robert F. Brattan (D), until May 10, 1894
 W. Laird Henry (D), from November 6, 1894
 . J. Frederick C. Talbott (D)
 . Henry W. Rusk (D)
 . Isidor Rayner (D)
 . Barnes Compton (D), until May 15, 1894
 Charles E. Coffin (R), from November 6, 1894
 . William M. McKaig (D)

Massachusetts 

 . Ashley B. Wright (R)
 . Frederick H. Gillett (R)
 . Joseph H. Walker (R)
 . Lewis D. Apsley (R)
 . Moses T. Stevens (D)
 . William Cogswell (R)
 . William Everett (D), from April 25, 1893
 . Samuel W. McCall (R)
 . Joseph H. O'Neil (D)
 . Michael J. McEttrick (ID)
 . William F. Draper (R)
 . Elijah A. Morse (R)
 . Charles S. Randall (R)

Michigan 

 . J. Logan Chipman (D), until August 17, 1893
 Levi T. Griffin (D), from December 4, 1893
 . James S. Gorman (D)
 . Julius C. Burrows (R), until January 23, 1895
 . Henry F. Thomas (R)
 . George F. Richardson (D)
 . David D. Aitken (R)
 . Justin R. Whiting (D)
 . William S. Linton (R)
 . John W. Moon (R)
 . Thomas A. E. Weadock (D)
 . John Avery (R)
 . Samuel M. Stephenson (R)

Minnesota 

 . James Albertus Tawney (R)
 . James T. McCleary (R)
 . Osee M. Hall (D)
 . Andrew R. Kiefer (R)
 . Loren Fletcher (R)
 . Melvin R. Baldwin (D)
 . Haldor E. Boen (P)

Mississippi 

 . John M. Allen (D)
 . John C. Kyle (D)
 . Thomas C. Catchings (D)
 . Hernando D. Money (D)
 . John Sharp Williams (D)
 . Thomas R. Stockdale (D)
 . Charles E. Hooker (D)

Missouri 

 . William H. Hatch (D)
 . Uriel S. Hall (D)
 . Alexander M. Dockery (D)
 . Daniel D. Burnes (D)
 . John C. Tarsney (D)
 . David A. De Armond (D)
 . John T. Heard (D)
 . Richard P. Bland (D)
 . James Beauchamp Clark (D)
 . Richard Bartholdt (R)
 . Charles F. Joy (R), until April 3, 1894
 John J. O'Neill (D), from April 3, 1894
 . Seth W. Cobb (D)
 . Robert W. Fyan (D)
 . Marshall Arnold (D)
 . Charles H. Morgan (D)

Montana 

 . Charles S. Hartman (R)

Nebraska 

 . William J. Bryan (D)
 . David H. Mercer (R)
 . George D. Meiklejohn (R)
 . Eugene J. Hainer (R)
 . William A. McKeighan (P)
 . Omer M. Kem (P)

Nevada 

 . Francis G. Newlands (D/S)

New Hampshire 

 . Henry W. Blair (R)
 . Henry M. Baker (R)

New Jersey 

 . Henry C. Loudenslager (R)
 . John J. Gardner (R)
 . Jacob A. Geissenhainer (D)
 . Johnston Cornish (D)
 . Cornelius A. Cadmus (D)
 . Thomas D. English (D)
 . George B. Fielder (D)
 . John T. Dunn (D)

New York 

 . James W. Covert (D)
 . John M. Clancy (D)
 . Joseph C. Hendrix (D)
 . William J. Coombs (D)
 . John H. Graham (D)
 . Thomas F. Magner (D)
 . Franklin Bartlett (D)
 . Edward J. Dunphy (D)
 . Timothy J. Campbell (D)
 . Daniel Sickles (D)
 . Amos J. Cummings (D), until November 21, 1894
 . W. Bourke Cockran (D)
 . J. De Witt Warner (D)
 . John R. Fellows (D), until December 31, 1893
 Lemuel E. Quigg (R), from January 30, 1894
 . Ashbel P. Fitch (D), until December 26, 1893
 Isidor Straus (D), from January 30, 1894
 . William Ryan (D)
 . Francis Marvin (R)
 . Jacob LeFever (R)
 . Charles D. Haines (D)
 . Charles Tracey (D)
 . Simon J. Schermerhorn (D)
 . Newton M. Curtis (R)
 . John M. Wever (R)
 . Charles A. Chickering (R)
 . James S. Sherman (R)
 . George W. Ray (R)
 . James J. Belden (R)
 . Sereno E. Payne (R)
 . Charles W. Gillet (R)
 . James W. Wadsworth (R)
 . John Van Voorhis (R)
 . Daniel N. Lockwood (D)
 . Charles Daniels (R)
 . Warren B. Hooker (R)

North Carolina 

 . William A. B. Branch (D)
 . Frederick A. Woodard (D)
 . Benjamin F. Grady (D)
 . Benjamin H. Bunn (D)
 . Thomas Settle III (R)
 . Sydenham B. Alexander (D)
 . John S. Henderson (D)
 . William H. Bower (D)
 . William T. Crawford (D)

North Dakota 

 . Martin N. Johnson (R)

Ohio 

 . Bellamy Storer (R)
 . John A. Caldwell (R), until May 4, 1894
 Jacob H. Bromwell (R), from December 3, 1894
 . George W. Houk (D), until February 9, 1894
 Paul J. Sorg (D), from May 21, 1894
 . Fernando C. Layton (D)
 . Dennis D. Donovan (D)
 . George W. Hulick (R)
 . George W. Wilson (R)
 . Luther M. Strong (R)
 . Byron F. Ritchie (D)
 . William H. Enochs (R), until July 13, 1893
 Hezekiah S. Bundy (R), from December 4, 1893
 . Charles H. Grosvenor (R)
 . Joseph H. Outhwaite (D)
 . Darius D. Hare (D)
 . Michael D. Harter (D)
 . Henry C. Van Voorhis (R)
 . Albert J. Pearson (D)
 . James A. D. Richards (D)
 . George P. Ikirt (D)
 . Stephen A. Northway (R)
 . William J. White (R)
 . Tom L. Johnson (D)

Oregon 

 . Binger Hermann (R)
 . William R. Ellis (R)

Pennsylvania 

 . Henry H. Bingham (R)
 . Charles O'Neill (R), until November 25, 1893
 Robert Adams Jr. (R), from December 19, 1893
 . William McAleer (D)
 . John E. Reyburn (R)
 . Alfred C. Harmer (R)
 . John B. Robinson (R)
 . Irving P. Wanger (R)
 . William Mutchler (D), until June 23, 1893
 Howard Mutchler (D), from August 7, 1893
 . Constantine J. Erdman (D)
 . Marriott Brosius (R)
 . Joseph A. Scranton (R)
 . William H. Hines (D)
 . James B. Reilly (D)
 . Ephraim M. Woomer (R)
 . Myron B. Wright (R), until November 13, 1894
 Edwin J. Jorden (R), from February 23, 1895
 . Albert C. Hopkins (R)
 . Simon P. Wolverton (D)
 . Thaddeus M. Mahon (R)
 . Frank E. Beltzhoover (D)
 . Josiah D. Hicks (R)
 . Daniel B. Heiner (R)
 . John Dalzell (R)
 . William A. Stone (R)
 . William A. Sipe (D)
 . Thomas W. Phillips (R)
 . Joseph C. Sibley (D)
 . Charles W. Stone (R)
 . George F. Kribbs (D)
 . Alexander McDowell (R)
 . William Lilly (R), until December 1, 1893
 Galusha A. Grow (R), from February 26, 1894

Rhode Island 

 . Oscar Lapham (D)
 . Charles H. Page (D), from April 5, 1893

South Carolina 

 . William H. Brawley (D), until February 12, 1894
 James F. Izlar (D), from April 12, 1894
 . William J. Talbert (D)
 . Asbury C. Latimer (D)
 . George W. Shell (D)
 . Thomas J. Strait (D)
 . John L. McLaurin (D)
 . George W. Murray (R)

South Dakota 

Both representatives were elected at-large statewide on a general ticket.
 . William V. Lucas (R)
 . John A. Pickler (R)

Tennessee 

 . Alfred A. Taylor (R)
 . John C. Houk (R)
 . Henry C. Snodgrass (D)
 . Benton McMillin (D)
 . James D. Richardson (D)
 . Joseph E. Washington (D)
 . Nicholas N. Cox (D)
 . Benjamin A. Enloe (D)
 . James C. McDearmon (D)
 . Josiah Patterson (D)

Texas 

 . Joseph C. Hutcheson (D)
 . Samuel B. Cooper (D)
 . Constantine B. Kilgore (D)
 . David B. Culberson (D)
 . Joseph W. Bailey (D)
 . Joseph Abbott (D)
 . George C. Pendleton (D)
 . Charles K. Bell (D)
 . Joseph D. Sayers (D)
 . Walter Gresham (D)
 . William H. Crain (D)
 . Thomas M. Paschal (D)
 . Jeremiah V. Cockrell (D)

Vermont 

 . H. Henry Powers (R)
 . William W. Grout (R)

Virginia 

 . William A. Jones (D)
 . D. Gardiner Tyler (D)
 . George D. Wise (D)
 . James F. Epes (D)
 . Claude A. Swanson (D)
 . Paul C. Edmunds (D)
 . Charles T. O'Ferrall (D), until December 28, 1893
 Smith S. Turner (D), from January 30, 1894
 . Elisha E. Meredith (D)
 . James W. Marshall (D)
 . Henry St. George Tucker III (D)

Washington 

Both representatives were elected at-large statewide on a general ticket.
 . William H. Doolittle (R)
 . John L. Wilson (R), until February 18, 1895

West Virginia 

 . John O. Pendleton (D)
 . William L. Wilson (D)
 . John D. Alderson (D)
 . James Capehart (D)

Wisconsin 

 . Henry Allen Cooper (R)
 . Charles Barwig (D)
 . Joseph W. Babcock (R)
 . Peter J. Somers (D), from August 27, 1893
 . George H. Brickner (D)
 . Owen A. Wells (D)
 . George B. Shaw (R), until August 27, 1894
 Michael Griffin (R), from November 5, 1894
 . Lyman E. Barnes (D)
 . Thomas Lynch (D)
 . Nils P. Haugen (R)

Wyoming 

 . Henry A. Coffeen (D)

Delegates

 . Marcus A. Smith (D)
 . Antonio Joseph (D)
 . Dennis T. Flynn (R)
 . Joseph L. Rawlins (D)

Changes in membership
The count below reflects changes from the beginning of the first session of this Congress.

Senate 
 Replacements: 6
 Democratic: no net change
 Republican: no net change
 Liberal Republican: 1 seat net loss
 Deaths: 4
 Resignations: 8
 Interim appointments: 2
Total seats with changes: 12

House of Representatives 
 Replacements: 22
 Democratic: 2 seat net gain
 Republican: 2 seat net loss
 Deaths: 11
 Resignations: 13
 Contested election: 3
Total seats with changes: 30

Committees

Senate

 Additional Accommodations for the Library of Congress (Select) (Chairman: Justin S. Morrill; Ranking Member: Matthew C. Butler)
 Agriculture and Forestry (Chairman: James Z. George; Ranking Member: James McMillan)
 Appropriations (Chairman: Francis M. Cockrell; Ranking Member: William B. Allison)
 Audit and Control the Contingent Expenses of the Senate (Chairman: Johnson N. Camden; Ranking Member: John P. Jones)
 Bribery Attempts Investigation (Special)
 Canadian Relations (Chairman: Edward Murphy Jr.; Ranking Member: George F. Hoar)
 Census (Chairman: David Turpie; Ranking Member: John P. Jones)
 Civil Service and Retrenchment (Chairman: Thomas J. Jarvis; Ranking Member: N/A)
 Claims (Chairman: Samuel Pasco; Ranking Member: John H. Mitchell)
 Coast Defenses (Chairman: John B. Gordon; Ranking Member: Watson C. Squire)
 Commerce (Chairman: Matt W. Ransom; Ranking Member: William P. Frye)
 Corporations Organized in the District of Columbia (Select) (Chairman: Nelson W. Aldrich)
 Distributing Public Revenue Among the States (Select)
 District of Columbia (Chairman: Isham G. Harris; Ranking Member: James McMillan)
 Education and Labor (Chairman: James H. Kyle; Ranking Member: Joseph M. Carey)
 Engrossed Bills (Chairman: William B. Allison; Ranking Member: John Martin)
 Enrolled Bills (Chairman: Donelson Caffery; Ranking Member: Fred T. Dubois)
 Epidemic Diseases (Chairman: John P. Jones; Ranking Member: Isham G. Harris)
 Establish a University in the United States (Select) (Chairman: Eppa Hunton; Ranking Member: Redfield Proctor)
 Examine the Several Branches in the Civil Service (Chairman: William A. Peffer; Ranking Member: Thomas C. Power)
 Finance (Chairman: Daniel W. Voorhees; Ranking Member: Justin S. Morrill)
 Fisheries (Chairman: Richard Coke; Ranking Member: Francis B. Stockbridge)
 Five Civilized Tribes of Indians (Select) (Chairman: Henry M. Teller; Ranking Member: Samuel Pasco)
 Ford Theater Disaster (Select) (Chairman: Isham G. Harris)
 Foreign Relations (Chairman: John Tyler Morgan; Ranking Member: John Sherman) 
 Forest Reservations (Select) (Chairman: William V. Allen; Ranking Member: Henry M. Teller)
 Geological Survey (Select) (Chairman: Anselm J. McLaurin; Ranking Member: Edward O. Wolcott)
 Immigration (Chairman: David B. Hill; Ranking Member: William E. Chandler)
 Indian Affairs (Chairman: James K. Jones; Ranking Member: Orville H. Platt)
 Indian Depredations (Chairman: William Lindsay; Ranking Member: George L. Shoup)
 Interstate Commerce (Chairman: Matthew C. Butler; Ranking Member: Shelby M. Cullom) 
 Irrigation and Reclamation of Arid Lands (Chairman: Stephen M. White; Ranking Member: William M. Stewart)
 Judiciary (Chairman: James L. Pugh; Ranking Member: George Frisbie Hoar) 
 Library (Chairman: Roger Q. Mills; Ranking Member: Edward O. Wolcott) 
 Manufactures (Chairman: Charles H. Gibson; Ranking Member: Anthony Higgins) 
 Military Affairs (Chairman: William B. Bate; Ranking Member: Joseph R. Hawley) 
 Mines and Mining (Chairman: William M. Stewart; Ranking Member: John P. Jones) 
 Mississippi River and its Tributaries (Select) (Chairman: Newton C. Blanchard; Ranking Member: William D. Washburn)
 National Banks (Select) (Chairman: John L. Mitchell; Ranking Member: J. Donald Cameron)
 Naval Affairs (Chairman: John R. McPherson; Ranking Member: J. Donald Cameron) 
 Nicaraguan Claims (Select)
 Organization, Conduct and Expeditures of Executive Departments (Chairman: James Smith Jr.; Ranking Member: James F. Wilson)
 Pacific Railroads (Chairman: Calvin S. Brice; Ranking Member: Cushman K. Davis)
 Patents (Chairman: Wilkinson Call; Ranking Member: Nathan F. Dixon)
 Pensions (Chairman: John M. Palmer; Ranking Member: George L. Shoup)
 Post Office and Post Roads (Chairman: William F. Vilas; Ranking Member: John H. Mitchell)
 Potomac River Front (Select) (Chairman: John R. McPherson)
 Printing (Chairman: Arthur P. Gorman; Ranking Member: Charles F. Manderson)
 Private Land Claims (Chairman: Eugene Hale; Ranking Member: Alfred H. Colquitt)
 Privileges and Elections (Chairman: George Gray; Ranking Member: George F. Hoar)
 Public Buildings and Grounds (Chairman: George G. Vest; Ranking Member: N/A)
 Public Distress (Select)
 Public Lands (Chairman: James H. Berry; Ranking Member: Joseph N. Dolph)
 Quadrocentennial (Select) (Chairman: Patrick Walsh; Ranking Member: William Lindsay)
 Railroads (Chairman: John Martin; Ranking Member: Joseph R. Hawley)
 Revision of the Laws (Chairman: John W. Daniel; Ranking Member: James F. Wilson)
 Revolutionary Claims (Chairman: J. Donald Cameron; Ranking Member: Richard Coke)
 Rules (Chairman: Joseph C.S. Blackburn; Ranking Member: Nelson W. Aldrich)
 Tariff Regulation (Select)
 Territories (Chairman: Charles J. Faulkner; Ranking Member: Orville H. Platt)
 Transportation and Sale of Meat Products (Select) (Chairman: Orville H. Platt; Ranking Member: Jacob H. Gallinger)
 Transportation Routes to the Seaboard (Chairman: John L.M. Irby; Ranking Member: Jacob H. Gallinger)
 United States Senate Committee on Trespassers upon Indian Lands (Chairman: William N. Roach; Ranking Member: Anthony Higgins)
 Whole
 Woman Suffrage (Select) (Chairman: George F. Hoar; Ranking Member: James Z. George)

House of Representatives

 Accounts (Chairman: Harry Welles Rusk; Ranking Member: Owen A. Wells)
 Agriculture (Chairman: William H. Hatch; Ranking Member: John S. Williams)
 Alcoholic Liquor Traffic (Select) (Chairman: Thomas Dunn English; Ranking Member: Michael J. McEttrick)
 Appropriations (Chairman: Joseph D. Sayers; Ranking Member: James R. Williams)
 Banking and Currency (Chairman: William M. Springer; Ranking Member: James R. Williams)
 Claims (Chairman: Benjamin H. Bunn; Ranking Member: Thomas Hammond)
 Coinage, Weights and Measures (Chairman: Richard P. Bland; Ranking Member: Henry A. Coffeen)
 Disposition of Executive Papers (Chairman: John S. Henderson; Ranking Member: John A. Caldwell)
 District of Columbia (Chairman: John T. Heard; Ranking Member: Charles M. Cooper)
 Education (Chairman: Benjamin A. Enloe; Ranking Member: Charles D. Haines)
 Election of the President, Vice President and Representatives in Congress (Chairman: Henry St. George Tucker; Ranking Member: Jesse F. Stallings)
 Elections (Chairman: Jason B. Brown; Ranking Member: Frederick A. Woodard)
 Enrolled Bills (Chairman: Albert J. Pearson; Ranking Member: Alva L. Hager)
 Expenditures in the Agriculture Department (Chairman: Paul C. Edmunds; Ranking Member: Omer Madison Kem)
 Expenditures in the Interior Department (Chairman: Henry G. Turner; Ranking Member: William W. Grout)
 Expenditures in the Justice Department (Chairman: Richard D. Dunphy; Ranking Member: Byron F. Ritchie)
 Expenditures in the Navy Department (Chairman: Benton McMillin; Ranking Member: Seth L. Milliken)
 Expenditures in the Post Office Department (Chairman: James A.D. Richards; Ranking Member: Ashley B. Wright)
 Expenditures in the State Department (Chairman: Rufus E. Lester; Ranking Member: Charles W. Stone)
 Expenditures in the Treasury Department (Chairman: Charles Barwig; Ranking Member: William A. Stone)
 Expenditures in the War Department (Chairman: Alexander B. Montgomery; Ranking Member: Robert R. Hitt)
 Expenditures on Public Buildings (Chairman: William H. Crain; Ranking Member: John W. Moon)
 Foreign Affairs (Chairman: James B. McCreary; Ranking Member: William Everett)
 Immigration and Naturalization (Chairman: Jacob A. Geissenhainer; Ranking Member: James G. Maguire)
 Irrigation of Arid Lands (Chairman: George W. Cooper; Ranking Member: Francis G. Newlands)
 Indian Affairs (Chairman: William S. Holman; Ranking Member: William H. Bower)
 Interstate and Foreign Commerce (Chairman: George D. Wise; Ranking Member: William H. Brawley)
 Invalid Pensions (Chairman: Augustus N. Martin; Ranking Member: George B. Fielder)
 Judiciary (Chairman: David B. Culberson; Ranking Member: Joseph W. Bailey) 
 Labor (Chairman: Lawrence E. McGann; Ranking Member: Lafe Pence)
 Levees and Improvements of the Mississippi River (Chairman: John M. Allen; Ranking Member: Frederick A. Woodard)
 Library (Chairman: Franklin Bartlett; Ranking Member: Charles O'Neill)
 Manufactures (Chairman: Charles H. Page; Ranking Member: Johnston Cornish)
 Merchant Marine and Fisheries (Chairman: George W. Fithian; Ranking Member: Johnston Cornish)
 Mileage (Chairman: Thomas Lynch; Ranking Member: George C. Pendleton)
 Military Affairs (Chairman: Joseph H. Outhwaite; Ranking Member: Charles H. Morgan)
 Militia (Chairman: Adolph Meyer; Ranking Member: John C. Bell)
 Mines and Mining (Chairman: Thomas A.E. Weadock; Ranking Member: William A. Baker)
 Naval Affairs (Chairman: Jacob A. Geissenhainer; Ranking Member: D. Gardiner Tyler)
 Pacific Railroads (Chairman: James B. Reilly; Ranking Member: Joseph C. Hendrix)
 Patents (Chairman: James W. Covert; Ranking Member: Robert Neill)
 Pensions (Chairman: Charles L. Moses; Ranking Member: Champ Clark)
 Post Office and Post Roads (Chairman: John S. Henderson; Ranking Member: Claude A. Swanson)
 Printing (Chairman: James D. Richardson; Ranking Member: Case Broderick)
 Private Land Claims (Chairman: John O. Pendleton; Ranking Member: Thomas J. Hudson)
 Public Buildings and Grounds (Chairman: John H. Bankhead; Ranking Member: Robert C. Davey)
 Public Lands (Chairman: Thomas Chipman McRae; Ranking Member: Asbury C. Latimer) 
 Railways and Canals (Chairman: Seth W. Cobb; Ranking Member: Marion Cannon) 
 Reform in the Civil Service (Chairman: Robert E. De Forest; Ranking Member: Arthur H. Taylor) 
 Revision of Laws (Chairman: William T. Ellis; Ranking Member: John W. Maddox) 
 Rivers and Harbors (Chairman: Thomas C. Catchings; Ranking Member: Philip D. McCulloch) 
 Rules (Chairman: Charles F. Crisp; Ranking Member: Thomas B. Reed)  
 Standards of Official Conduct
 Territories (Chairman: Joseph Wheeler; Ranking Member: Haldor E. Boen) 
 Ventilation and Acoustics (Chairman: George W. Shell; Ranking Member: Joseph H. Walker) 
 War Claims (Chairman: Frank E. Beltzhoover; Ranking Member: Byron F. Ritchie) 
 Ways and Means (Chairman: William L. Wilson; Ranking Member: William D. Bynum) 
 Whole

Joint committees

 Celebrate the Centennial of the Laying of the Capitol Cornerstone
 Conditions of Indian Tribes (Special)
 Dedication of Chickamauga and Chattanooga National Military Park
 Disposition of (Useless) Executive Papers
 Ford's Theater Disaster
 The Library
 Printing
 Naval Affairs
 Naval Personnel

Caucuses
 Democratic (House)
 Democratic (Senate)

Employees

Legislative branch agency directors
 Architect of the Capitol: Edward Clark
 Librarian of Congress: Ainsworth Rand Spofford 
 Public Printer of the United States: Francis W. Palmer, until 1894
 Thomas E. Benedict, from 1894

Senate 
 Chaplain of the Senate: William H. Millburn (Methodist)
 Secretary of the Senate: Anson G. McCook, until April 6, 1893
 William Ruffin Cox, elected April 6, 1893
 Librarian of the Senate: Alonzo M. Church
 Sergeant at Arms of the Senate: Edward K. Valentine, until August 8, 1893
 Richard J. Bright, elected August 8, 1893

House of Representatives 
 Chaplain of the House: Samuel W. Haddaway (Methodist), elected August 7, 1893
 Edward B. Bagby (Christian), elected December 4, 1893
 Clerk of the House: James Kerr
 Doorkeeper of the House: Alvin B. Hurt, elected August 7, 1893
 Postmaster of the House: Lycurgus Dalton, elected August 7, 1893
 Reading Clerks: Thomas S. Pettit (D) and Neill S. Brown Jr. (R)
 Clerk at the Speaker's Table: Charles R. Crisp
 Sergeant at Arms of the House: Samuel S. Yoder, until August 7, 1893
 Herman W. Snow, from August 7, 1893

See also 
 1892 United States elections (elections leading to this Congress)
 1892 United States presidential election
 1892–93 United States Senate elections
 1892 United States House of Representatives elections
 1894 United States elections (elections during this Congress, leading to the next Congress)
 1894–95 United States Senate elections
 1894 United States House of Representatives elections

References

External links
Biographical Directory of the U.S. Congress
U.S. House of Representatives: House History
U.S. Senate: Statistics and Lists